Asif Saeed Khan Khosa (born 21 December 1954) is a Pakistani jurist who served as the 26th Chief Justice of Pakistan from 18 January 2019 to 20 December 2019. He joined the Supreme Court as a judge on 18 February 2010 and prior to that served as judge of the Lahore High Court.

During his tenure as Justice of Supreme Court he was part of the benches who disqualified two prime ministers Yousuf Raza Gillani and Nawaz Sharif. During his tenure as Chief Justice, he nullified the Imran Khan government's decision to extend Qamar Javed Bajwa as Chief of Army Staff (COAS) for another three-year term and directed the government to put the tenure into law in under six months while giving the temporary extension of six months to Bajwa as COAS. This was first time in history of Pakistan that the extension or the tenure of an army chief was questioned by the Supreme Court. Under his supervision a special court in Islamabad sentenced a former military dictator Pervez Musharraf to death.

Early life and family
Khosa was born in Dera Ghazi Khan, Punjab, Pakistan. He belongs to Khosa tribe which is a Baloch tribe in Pakistan. Asif Saeed Khan Khosa passed his matriculation in 1969 from the Multan Board, securing fifth position. He was admitted to Government College University in Lahore for intermediate and secured first position in the Lahore Board. Then in 1973 he appeared for the B.A exams from Government College Lahore at Punjab University and secured first position. 

During his education in Punjab university he was inspired from the thoughts of Syed Abul A'ala Maududi and Maulana Naeem Siddiqui. He secured a National Scholarship Award. He did his master's degree in English Language and Literature at the University of the Punjab in 1975. He was then admitted to Queens' College, Cambridge and did his Master of Laws with specialization in Public International Law. Later he was called to the Bar on 26 July 1979 at the Lincoln's Inn, London.

Khosa is the son-in-law of former Chief Justice of Pakistan Nasim Hasan Shah and brother of retired federal secretary Nasir Mahmood Khosa. He is also the cousin of former Governor Punjab Latif Khosa.

Judicial career
Before becoming a judge, he was an advocate of the Supreme Court Bar Association and Lahore High Court Bar Association. He was called to the Bar at the Honourable Society of Lincoln's Inn, London, Great Britain on 26 July 1979.

Barrister Khosa was elevated to the Bench and appointed as Lahore High Court Judge in May 1998. When General Pervez Musharraf declared a state of emergency in November 2007, suspending the constitution and demanded the judges of the superior judiciary retake their oath under the Provisional Constitutional Order (PCO), Justice Khosa like then-Chief Justice Iftikhar Muhammad Chaudhry, and many other senior judges, refused to retake the oath. They were suspended from their duties. On 18 August 2008, he was restored to his prior position as High Court Justice as a result of a lawyer's movement to restore the "deposed judges". He was among the larger bench of seven Supreme Court justices that was hearing Prime Minister Yousaf Raza Gillani's contempt of court case. In that case Supreme Court gave its judgement that had an additional attachment of Justice Khosa's extraordinary six-page note that became the subject of headlines in May, 2012. Justice Khosa quoting Kahlil Gibran wrote about the "Pity of the Nation" that became subject of media coverage all over the country. He also headed the larger bench of the Supreme Court that was hearing the "Panama Case" related to the alleged money laundering and off-shore illegal investment by former Prime Minister Nawaz Sharif and his family. Remarking on article 62 and 63 of the constitution in the "Panama Case" hearing he said:This case is the first of its kind… we know the gravity of a declaration by the court and its affect for both the parties, saying that someone was not honest. But we have to lay down parameters, otherwise, except for the Jamaat-i-Islami chief Sirajul Haq, no one will survive.

As article 62 and 63 are related to truthfulness and honesty of parliamentarians, it became a matter of controversy in the media, because Justice Khosa was pointing out that there is no truthful and honest parliamentarian except Siraj-ul-Haq. Justice Khosa had to withdraw his remarks, after he reconsidered them. He said he was sorry for his such remarks. Justice Khosa is being considered the most relentless judge in larger bench of the "Panama Case". The final verdict issued by the larger bench on the "Panama Case" against Prime Minister Nawaz Sharif and his family has proposed a JIT within 60 days. In the final verdict Justice Khosa and Justice Gulzar in their remarks disqualified Prime Minister Nawaz Sharif from running for office. Their statement says:The Election Commission of Pakistan is directed to issue a notification of disqualification of respondent No. 1 namely Mian Muhammad Nawaz Sharif from being a member of the Majlis-e-Shoora (Parliament) with effect from the date of announcement of the present judgment .

On 2 January 2019, President Arif Alvi approved Khosa's appointment as the next Chief Justice of Pakistan.

References

External links
Supreme Court of Pakistan

1954 births
Living people
Baloch people
Alumni of Queens' College, Cambridge
Government College University, Lahore alumni
Justices of the Supreme Court of Pakistan
Pakistani judges
University of the Punjab alumni
Chief justices of Pakistan